Pirzada Mohammad Nawsad Siddique (born: 1993) is an Indian politician from West Bengal. He is the Chairman the Indian Secular Front. Currently, he is serving as an MLA from Bhangar constituency in the West Bengal Legislative Assembly. He is Great grandson of the Pir of Furfura Mohammad Abu Bakr Siddique.

Early life 
Nawsad Siddiqui was born in 1993. His father Ali Akbar Siddiqui was the son of Pir Zulfiqar Ali, known as "Chhto Huzur" of Furfura Sharif. He is the fourth generation of the founder of Furfura Sharif Mohammad Abu Bakr Siddique. Nawsad's elder brother Abbas Siddiqui is the founder of the Indian Secular Front. In 2015, he obtained a master's degree under Aliah University.

Political career 
On 21 January 2021, Abbas Siddiqui founded a new political party called the Indian Secular Front and appointed his younger brother Nawsad as its chairman. Ahead of the 2021 assembly elections, the party formed a united front called Sanjukta Morcha with the Indian National Congress and the Left Front.

In the 2021 West Bengal Legislative Assembly election, Nawsad was elected from Bhangar. The Sanjukta Morcha won only this seat in the election.

Reference 

21st-century Indian politicians
Aliah University alumni
West Bengal politicians
West Bengal MLAs 2021–2026
People from Hooghly district
1993 births
Living people
Indian Secular Front politicians
Indian secularists
21st-century Bengalis